Pedia may be:
the plural of pedion, a triclinic crystal form having a single face
an abbreviation of encyclopedia
an abbreviation of pediatrics
Pedia gens, an ancient Roman family
A nickname for Wikipedia, the free encyclopedia.

See also 
 Paidia, a genus of moths
 Paideia, a concept in Greek and Roman society